Comiskey Park was a baseball park in Chicago, Illinois, located in the
Armour Square neighborhood on the near-southwest side of the city. The stadium served as the home of the Chicago White Sox of the American League from 1910 through 1990. Built by White Sox owner Charles Comiskey and designed by Zachary Taylor Davis, Comiskey Park hosted four World Series and more than 6,000 Major League Baseball games. Also, in one of the most famous boxing matches in history, the field was the site of the 1937 heavyweight title match in which Joe Louis defeated then champion James J. Braddock in eight rounds that launched Louis' unprecedented 11-plus year run as the heavyweight champion of the world.

The Chicago Cardinals of the National Football League also called Comiskey Park home when they were not playing at Normal Park, Soldier Field or Wrigley Field. They won the 1947 NFL Championship Game over the Philadelphia Eagles at Comiskey Park. Much less popular than the Bears, the Cardinals had their last season at Comiskey in 1958, and they left for St. Louis in March 1960. The Chicago American Giants of the Negro American League called Comiskey Park home from 1941 to 1950. The park was also home to Chicago Mustangs and Chicago Sting of the NASL, playing host to the final edition of the original Soccer Bowl.

Adjacent to the south (across 35th Street), a new ballpark opened in 1991, and Comiskey Park was demolished the same year. Originally also called Comiskey Park, it was renamed U.S. Cellular Field in 2003 and Guaranteed Rate Field in 2016.

Early years

The park was built on a former city dump that Comiskey bought in 1909 to replace the wooden South Side Park. Originally White Sox Park, within three years it was renamed for White Sox founder and owner Charles Comiskey. The original name was restored in 1962, then it changed back to Comiskey Park in 1976.

Comiskey Park was very modern for its time. It was the third concrete-and-steel stadium in the major leagues to be built since 1909. As originally built, it seated almost 32,000, a record at the time. Briefly, it retained the nickname "The Baseball Palace of the World."

The park's design was strongly influenced by Sox pitcher Ed Walsh, and was known for its pitcher-friendly proportions ( to the foul poles;  to center field). Later changes were made, but the park remained more or less favorable to defensive teams. For many years this reflected on the White Sox style of play: solid defense, and short, quick hits.  The park was unusual in that no player hit 100 home runs there: Carlton Fisk set the record with 94.

The first game in Comiskey Park was a 2–0 loss to the St. Louis Browns on July 1, 1910.  The first no-hitter at Comiskey Park was in 1911, hurled by Ed Walsh on August 27, a 5–0 win over Boston. The Sox won their first home night game, over St. Louis on August 14, 1939, 5–2.

Special baseball events

World Series
Comiskey Park was the site of four World Series contests. In 1917, the Chicago White Sox won Games 1, 2 and 5 at Comiskey Park and went on to defeat the New York Giants four games to two. In 1918, Comiskey Park hosted the World Series between the Chicago Cubs and Boston Red Sox. The Cubs borrowed Comiskey Park for the series because of its larger seating capacity. The Red Sox defeated the Cubs four games to two. Games 1–3 were played at Comiskey Park. The Red Sox won games one and three. Attendance was under capacity in that war year. The best crowd was Game 3, with some 27,000 patrons.

In 1919, the White Sox lost the infamous "Black Sox" World Series to the Cincinnati Reds, five games to three in a nine-game series. Games three, four, five and eight were played at Comiskey Park. The White Sox won game three and lost games four, five and eight.

In 1959, the White Sox lost four games to two to the Los Angeles Dodgers. Games one, two and six were played at Comiskey Park. The White Sox won game one and lost games two and six. With their win in Game 6 at Comiskey Park, the Los Angeles Dodgers became the first West Coast team to win a World Series.

Comiskey saw its last post-season action in 1983, when the White Sox lost the American League Championship Series to the Baltimore Orioles 3–1, with Games 3 and 4 in Chicago. Baltimore went on to win the World Series.

All-Star Games

Comiskey Park was the site of three Major League Baseball All-Star Games, and each marked a turn in the direction of dominance by one league or the other:
 The first All-Star Game was held in 1933. It began as a promotion by Arch Ward, sports editor of the Chicago Tribune, in connection with the 1933 Century of Progress Exposition being held on Chicago's lakefront. The Americans defeated the Nationals, helped in part by a home run by Babe Ruth, who was nearing the end of his career, but could still swing a mighty bat. The game also inaugurated a stretch when the Americans dominated, winning 12 of the first 16 (skipping 1945 because of wartime travel restrictions).
 The park next hosted the July classic in 1950, a game best remembered for Ted Williams' collision with the outfield wall that broke his elbow and ended his playing season. Less remembered is that it began a turnaround for the Nationals, who won the game in extra innings and started to win frequently, a trend that continued for more than three decades, building up an astounding 30 wins against only 6 losses and 1 tie (from 1959 to 1962 two games were held each year).
 The 50th Anniversary All-Star Game in 1983 was held at Comiskey Park in commemoration of the first All-Star Game at that same venue. The American League's lopsided win, including the first-ever grand slam in an All-Star Game, by Fred Lynn, turned out to signal an end to the National League's dominance in the mid-summer classic. During the last eight years of the park's existence the Americans went 5–3. Hosting a winning All-Star Game was also a good omen for the Sox, as they won their division in 1983, the first baseball title of any kind in Chicago since the Sox won the 1959 pennant.
 Comiskey Park was the most frequent home to the Negro leagues East-West All-Star Game from 1933 to 1960. The Negro leagues' all-star game achieved higher attendance in some years than its Major League Baseball counterpart, thanks in part to Comiskey's high attendance capacity.

Fans
From 1971 until its demolition in 1991, Comiskey was the oldest park still in use in Major League Baseball (it had already been the oldest in the American League since 1955). Many of its known characteristics, such as the pinwheels on the "exploding" scoreboard, were installed by Bill Veeck (owner of the White Sox from 1959 to 1961, and again from 1976 to 1981). Another Veeck innovation was the "picnic area", created by replacing portions of the left field walls (the side of the field not facing the setting sun) with screens and setting up picnic tables under the seating areas. This concept was later extended to right field. During Veeck's second ownership, he installed a shower behind the speaker horns in the center field bleachers, for fans to cool off on hot summer days.

From 1960 to 1990, Sox fans were also entertained by Andy the Clown, famous for his famous Jerry Colonna-like elongated cry, "Come ooooooooooon, go! White! Sox!"

Starting in the 1970s, Sox fans were further entertained by organist Nancy Faust who picked up on spontaneous chants of fans who were singing tunes like, "We will, we will, SOX YOU!" and popularized the now-ubiquitous farewell to departing pitchers and ejected managers, "Na-na-na-na, na-na-na-na, hey-hey, GOOD-BYE!"

Before he became an institution on the north side with the Cubs, Sox broadcaster Harry Caray was a south side icon. At some point he started "conducting" Take Me Out to the Ball Game during the seventh-inning stretch, egged on by Veeck, who (according to Harry himself) said that the fans would sing along when they realized that none of them sang any worse than Harry did; Caray would take this tradition with him to the Cubs at Wrigley Field, which has continued even with Caray's death in 1998. Harry would sometimes broadcast from the center field bleachers, where he could hobnob with fans and get a suntan (or a burn).

The largest crowd at Old Comiskey Park was in 1973 with a crowd of 55,555 (which was 11,063 over capacity) on May 20 for a doubleheader against the Minnesota Twins, which also had the promotion of "Bat Day". By contrast, just over two years earlier, the smallest attendance at the park was recorded, with 511 spectators attending a game against the Boston Red Sox on Thursday, May 6, 1971.

Disco Demolition Night

A major and oft-mentioned promotional event held at Old Comiskey was "Disco Demolition Night" in 1979, organized by longtime Chicago radio personality Steve Dahl and White Sox promotions manager Mike Veeck (Bill's son) on Thursday, July 12.  Between games of a make-up doubleheader between the White Sox and the Detroit Tigers, Dahl and his crew destroyed a pile of disco records that fans had brought in exchange for a ticket with a discounted price of 98¢ in honor of Dahl's station at that time, WLUP-FM, the frequency of which was 97.9 MHz (98 FM). More than 50,000 fans were in attendance, along with another 20,000 who crashed the gates even though the game was sold out. The demolition tore a huge hole in center field and several thousand fans, many of them intoxicated, stormed the field, stole equipment, and destroyed the infield.  The nightcap was postponed, but league officials ruled it a forfeit the next day, the fourth in American League history, all in the 1970s. Later, some blamed Dahl; some blamed Veeck. Howard Cosell even blamed then-White Sox announcer Harry Caray, saying Caray contributed to a "carnival" atmosphere. In reality, a handful of rowdies had taken advantage of a situation for which stadium security was woefully unprepared. "I never thought that I, a stupid disc jockey, could draw 70,000 people to a disco demolition," Dahl said in a Tribune interview. "Unfortunately, some of our followers got a little carried away." That was the last anti-disco rally for WLUP. But it brought Dahl national attention and established him as a radio superstar in Chicago.

Transitions
When Bill Veeck re-acquired the team, he took out the center field fence, reverting to the original distance to the wall (posted as 440 in the 1940s, re-measured as 445 in the 1970s) ... a tough target, but reachable by sluggers like Oscar Gamble and Richie Zisk and other members of a team that was tagged "The South Side Hit Men". They were long removed from their days as "The Hitless Wonders". During that time the ballpark also featured a lounge where one could buy mixed drinks. This prompted some writers to dub Comiskey "Chicago's Largest Outdoor Saloon".

Final years

In 1969, AstroTurf was installed in the infield and the adjacent foul territory, with the outfield and adjoining foul territory remaining as natural grass. It was the first outdoor field in the major leagues to install artificial turf. After seven seasons, the artificial turf was removed prior to the 1976 season.

During its last eight years, Comiskey's annual attendance surpassed the two million mark three times, including the final season when the Sox contended for much of the year before losing the western division title to the Oakland Athletics.

White Sox owner Jerry Reinsdorf received more than $200 million in public financing for the new stadium after threatening to move the club to St. Petersburg, Florida (a similar threat was later used by the San Francisco Giants until they broke ground on what would be their current ballpark in late 1997). An interesting phenomenon occurred in the Illinois state legislature, in that the Speaker (Michael Madigan)  stopped the clock on the evening of June 30, 1988 so that the legislature could report that the money had been granted on June 30, and not July 1. The stadium now called Tropicana Field was constructed by officials in St. Petersburg in an effort to lure a Major League Baseball club to Florida (which arrived in 1998 in the form of the expansion Devil Rays), but Miami beat the Tampa Bay area to the punch when it launched the expansion Florida Marlins in 1993. The deal was sealed in a last-minute legislative maneuver by then-governor James R. Thompson.

On September 30, 1990, with 42,849 in paid attendance, the Chicago White Sox played the last game at Comiskey Park, defeating the Seattle Mariners 2–1 . Mayor Richard M. Daley (a lifelong White Sox fan) threw out the opening pitch,  legendary Sox player Minnie Miñoso delivered the lineup card to the umpires, and well-known ball-park organist Nancy Faust played for the crowd during the final game.  Also, former White Sox Vice President Charles Comiskey, grandson of the man for whom the park was named, was on hand.  The final play occurred when White Sox closer Bobby Thigpen forced Mariners' second baseman Harold Reynolds to hit a grounder to second baseman Scott Fletcher, who in return threw it to first baseman Steve Lyons for the force-out. The crowd then joined the organist by singing a final rendition of their unofficial victory song "Na Na Hey Hey Kiss Him Goodbye."

Comiskey Park was demolished in 1991; starting from behind the right field corner, the process took all summer to complete. The last portion to come down was the center field bleachers and the "exploding" scoreboard. The site of the old park was turned into a parking lot to serve those attending games at the new Comiskey Park (later renamed U.S. Cellular Field, now Guaranteed Rate Field).

At the time Comiskey was demolished, Chicago's two baseball stadiums were a combined 157 years old.

Bill Veeck once remarked that "There is no more beautiful sight in the world than a ballpark full of people!" On its best days, Comiskey was stuffed to the gills, with 55,000 people or more lining the aisles and even standing for 9 (or 18) innings on the sloping ramps that criss-crossed behind the scoreboard. The nearly-fully enclosed stands had a way of capturing and reverberating the noise without any artificial enhancement. Chicago sportswriter Alan Solomon remarked in 1988 that growing up in Chicago, "Wrigley Field yayed and Comiskey Park roared.

'Old' Comiskey's home plate is a marble plaque on the sidewalk next to Guaranteed Rate Field, and the field is a parking lot. Foul lines are painted on the lot. Also, the spectator ramp across 35th Street is designed in such a way (partly curved, partly straight but angling east-northeast) that it echoes the outline of part of the old grandstand.

Shortly before the park's demolition, the ballpark was featured in the movie Only the Lonely. John Candy's character (on a first date) arranged to have a private picnic on the stadium grass under the lights with his date (Ally Sheedy).  Candy made a reference of the stadium's impending demolition during the date.

When the Sox won the 2005 World Series, their victory parade began at U.S. Cellular Field, and then circled the block where old Comiskey had stood, before heading on a route through various south side neighborhoods and toward downtown Chicago.

Nicholson home run
On May 6, 1964, White Sox outfielder Dave Nicholson hit a home run that either bounced atop the left-field roof or entirely cleared it. The home run was officially measured at 573 feet, and is one of baseball's all-time longest.

No-hitters at Comiskey
 Ed Walsh, Chicago White Sox. August 27, 1911. White Sox 5 – 0 Red Sox
 Vern Kennedy, Chicago White Sox. August 31, 1935. White Sox 5 – 0 Indians
 Bill Dietrich Chicago White Sox. June 1, 1937. White Sox 8 – 0 St. Louis Browns
 Bob Feller, Cleveland Indians. April 16, 1940. Indians 1- 0 White Sox
 Bob Keegan, Chicago White Sox. August 20, 1957. White Sox 6 – 0 Washington Senators
 Bill Monbouquette, Boston Red Sox. August 1, 1962. Red Sox 4 – 0 White Sox
 Joe Horlen, Chicago White Sox. September 10, 1967. White Sox 6 – 0 Tigers
 Jack Morris, Detroit Tigers. April 7, 1984. Tigers 4 – 0 White Sox

Notable concerts

Other events

Boxing
 On June 22, 1937, Comiskey Park was host to the James Braddock vs. Joe Louis heavyweight world title fight.
On Sept 25, 1962, Sonny Liston fought then world heavyweight champ Floyd Patterson.

Soccer
 October 1, 1984 8,352 attended the first game of Soccer Bowl '84.
 Comiskey Park was the host of the 1990 Marlboro Cup. Among the players participating were Enrique Díaz, Arnoldo Iguarán, Carlos Estrada, Daniel Pighín, Eric Wynalda, Juan Cayasso, Leszek Pisz, Luis Fajardo, Piotr Nowak, Roberto Siboldi, and Roman Kosecki.

References

External links

 BaseballLibrary.com
 Ballparks.com

American football venues in Chicago
Baseball venues in Chicago
Boxing venues in Chicago
Sports venues in Chicago
Armour Square, Chicago
Demolished buildings and structures in Chicago
Demolished sports venues in Illinois
Defunct sports venues in Illinois
Defunct Major League Baseball venues
Defunct National Football League venues
Chicago White Sox stadiums
Chicago Cardinals stadiums
c
Negro league baseball venues
North American Soccer League (1968–1984) stadiums
Defunct soccer venues in the United States
American Football League (1926) venues
Card-Pitt
Sports venues completed in 1910
1910 establishments in Illinois
1990 disestablishments in Illinois
Sports venues demolished in 1991
Jewel Box parks